Rhacophorus robertingeri  is a species of frogs in the family Rhacophoridae endemic to Vietnam. First found in the Annamite Mountains of Vietnam, it is now known from mountain areas between Hà Giang or Nghệ An Province in the north and Gia Lai or Bình Thuận Province in the south, depending on the source. This species can be differentiated from its congeners based on the pointed projection at the tibiotarsal articulation, as well as coloration.

Etymology
The specific name robertingeri honors Robert F. Inger, famous American zoologist from the Field Museum of Natural History.

Description
Adult males measure  and females  in snout–vent length. The habitus is stocky with relatively large and broad head. The snout is sharply pointed. The tympanum is distinct. The fingers have large discs; those of the toes are smaller. Basal webbing is present. Dorsal skin is generally smooth. The dorsum has variable color and patterning. The coloration is dominated by yellow-and red-brown tones. There are orange, cream, white and dark brown spots. The ventrum is can be light gray, cream, or ivory color. It may be immaculate or have pronounced.

Habitat and conservation
It is associated with montane streams. Peak reproductive season is March–June and October–November. Males call diurnally but amplexus takes places only after dusk. The pair constructs a foam nest in leaves hanging near water. Upon hatching, the tadpoles fall down and enter the stream.

Habitat loss through deforestation is likely a threat to this species. It occurs in many protected areas: A Yun Pa Proposed Nature Reserve, Kon Cha Rang Nature Reserve, Kon Ka Kinh National Park, Ngoch Linh Nature Reserve, Ba Na-Nui Chua Nature Reserve, Nui Ong Nature Reserve, and Bạch Mã National Park.

References

Further reading
Ziegler, Thomas, et al. "New amphibian and reptile records from Ha Giang Province, northern Vietnam." Herpetol. Notes 7 (2014): 185-201.
Nguyen, T., and Thomas Ziegler. "Amphibian Research and Conservation in Vietnam." Froglog104 (2012): 21-23.
Tao, Nguyen Thien, et al. "A Preliminary Study of Phylogenetic Relationships and Taxonomic Problems of Vietnamese Rhacophorus (Anura: Rhacophoridae)." Russian Journal of Herpetology 21.4 (2014): 274-280.

robertingeri
Frogs of Asia
Amphibians of Vietnam
Endemic fauna of Vietnam
Amphibians described in 2012
Taxa named by Natalia B. Ananjeva
Taxa named by Peter Geissler
Taxa named by Nikolai Loutseranovitch Orlov
Taxa named by Nikolay A. Poyarkov Jr.
Taxa named by Sang Ngoc Nguyen